Rainer Berger (born 23 September 1944) is a German sprinter. He competed in the men's 4 × 100 metres relay at the 1964 Summer Olympics.

References

1944 births
Living people
Athletes (track and field) at the 1964 Summer Olympics
German male sprinters
Olympic athletes of the United Team of Germany
Place of birth missing (living people)